There are a number of Unix-like operating systems based on or descended from the Berkeley Software Distribution (BSD) series of Unix variant options. The three most notable descendants in current use are FreeBSD, OpenBSD, and NetBSD, which are all derived from 386BSD and 4.4BSD-Lite, by various routes. Both NetBSD and FreeBSD started life in 1993, initially derived from 386BSD, but in 1994 migrating to a 4.4BSD-Lite code base. OpenBSD was forked from NetBSD in 1995. Other notable derivatives include DragonFly BSD, which was forked from FreeBSD 4.8, and Apple Inc.'s iOS and macOS, with its Darwin base including a large amount of code derived from FreeBSD.

Most of the current BSD operating systems are open source and available for download, free of charge, under the BSD License, the most notable exceptions being macOS and iOS. They also generally use a monolithic kernel architecture, apart from macOS, iOS, and DragonFly BSD which feature hybrid kernels. The various open source BSD projects generally develop the kernel and userland programs and libraries together, the source code being managed using a single central source repository.

In the past, BSD was also used as a basis for several proprietary versions of UNIX, such as Sun's SunOS, Sequent's Dynix, NeXT's NeXTSTEP, DEC's Ultrix and OSF/1 AXP (which became the now discontinued Tru64 UNIX). Parts of NeXT's software became the foundation for macOS which, together with iOS, is among the most commercially successful BSD variants in the general market.

Aims and philosophies

FreeBSD
FreeBSD aims to make an operating system usable for any purpose. It is intended to run a wide variety of applications, be easy to use, contain cutting edge features, and be highly scalable on very high load network servers. FreeBSD is free software, and the project prefers the FreeBSD license. However, they sometimes accept non-disclosure agreements (NDAs) and include a limited number of nonfree hardware abstraction layer (HAL) modules for specific device drivers in their source tree, to support the hardware of companies who do not provide purely libre drivers (such as HALs to program software-defined radios so that vendors do not share their nonfree algorithms).

To maintain a high level of quality and provide good support for "production quality commercial off-the-shelf (COTS) workstation, server, and high-end embedded systems", FreeBSD focuses on a narrow set of architectures. A significant focus of development since 2000 has been fine-grained locking and SMP scalability. From 2007 on, most of the kernel was fine-locked and scaling improvements started to be seen. Other recent work includes Common Criteria security functionality, such as mandatory access control and security event audit support.

Derivatives:

TrueNAS/FreeNAS – a network-attached storage (NAS) operating system based on FreeBSD.
FuryBSD – a FreeBSD-based operating system, founded after Project Trident decided to build on Void Linux instead of TrueOS. Discontinued in October 2020.
GhostBSD – a FreeBSD-based operating system with OpenRC and OS packages.
Junos OS – a FreeBSD-based nonfree operating system distributed with Juniper Networks hardware.
NomadBSD – a persistent live system for USB flash drives, based on FreeBSD.
ClonOS – virtual hosting platform/appliance based on FreeBSD.
pfSense – an open source firewall/router computer software distribution based on FreeBSD.
OPNsense – an open source firewall/router computer software distribution based on FreeBSD.
BSDRP – BSD Router Project: Open Source Router Distribution based on FreeBSD.
HardenedBSD – HardenedBSD is a security-enhanced fork of FreeBSD.
StarBSD –  is a Unix-like, server-oriented operating system based on FreeBSD for Mission-Critical Enterprise Environment.
TrueOS (previously PC-BSD) – was a FreeBSD based  server operating system, previously a desktop operating system. The project was officially discontinued in May 2020.
XigmaNAS – a network-attached storage (NAS) server software with a dedicated management web interface.
helloSystem - a GUI-focused system with a macOS interface.
CheriBSD –  adapted to support CHERI-MIPS, CHERI-RISC-V, and Arm Morello ISAs.

NetBSD
NetBSD aims to provide a freely redistributable operating system that professionals, hobbyists, and researchers can use in any manner they wish. The main focus is portability, through the use of clear distinctions between machine-dependent and machine-independent code. It runs on a wide variety of 32-bit and 64-bit processor architectures and hardware platforms, and is intended to interoperate well with other operating systems. NetBSD places emphasis on correct design, well-written code, stability, and efficiency, where practical, close compliance with open API and protocol standards is also aimed for. In June 2008, the NetBSD Foundation moved to a two-clause BSD license, citing changes at UCB and industry applicability. NPF is a project spawned by NetBSD.

Derivatives:

OS108 – system with graphical desktop environment based on NetBSD.

OpenBSD
OpenBSD is a security-focused BSD known for its developers' insistence on extensive, ongoing code auditing for security and correct functionality, a "secure by default" philosophy, good documentation, and adherence to strictly open source licensing. The system incorporates numerous security features that are absent or optional in other versions of BSD. The OpenBSD policy on openness extends to hardware documentation and drivers, since without these, there can be no trust in the correct operation of the kernel and its security, and vendor software bugs would be hard to resolve.

OpenBSD emphasizes very high standards in all areas. Security policies include disabling all non-essential services and having sane initial settings; and integrated cryptography (originally made easier due to relaxed Canadian export laws relative to the United States), full public disclosure of all security flaws discovered; thoroughly auditing code for bugs and security issues; various security features, including the W^X page protection technology and heavy use of randomization to mitigate attacks. Coding approaches include an emphasis on searching for similar issues throughout the code base if any code issue is identified. Concerning software freedom, OpenBSD prefers the BSD or ISC license, with the GPL acceptable only for existing software which is impractical to replace, such as the GNU Compiler Collection. NDAs are never considered acceptable. In common with its parent, NetBSD, OpenBSD strives to run on a wide variety of hardware. Where licenses conflict with OpenBSD's philosophy, the OpenBSD team has re-implemented major pieces of software from scratch, which have often become the standard used within other versions of BSD. Examples include the pf packet filter, new privilege separation techniques used to safeguard tools such as tcpdump and tmux, much of the OpenSSH codebase, and replacing GPL licensed tools such as diff, grep and pkg-config with ISC or BSD licensed equivalents.

OpenBSD prominently notes the success of its security approach on its website home page. , only two vulnerabilities have ever been found in its default install (an OpenSSH vulnerability found in 2002, and a remote network vulnerability found in 2007) in a period of almost 22 years. According to OpenBSD expert Michael W. Lucas, OpenBSD "is widely regarded as the most secure operating system available anywhere, under any licensing terms."

OpenBSD has spawned numerous child projects such as OpenSSH, OpenNTPD, OpenBGPD, OpenSMTPD, PF, CARP, and LibreSSL. Many of these are designed to replace restricted alternatives.

Derivatives:

LibertyBSD – Aimed to be a 'deblobbed' version of OpenBSD. There are a number of reasons as to why blobs can be problematic, according to the project. LibertyBSD began going through the process to become Free Software Foundation FSDG certified, but ultimately never was accepted. LibertyBSD is no longer actively developed, and the project page directs people instead to HyperbolaBSD.
Isotop, a French project aiming to adapt OpenBSD to desktops and laptops, using xfce then dwm

DragonFly BSD
DragonFly BSD aims to be inherently easy to understand and develop for multi-processor infrastructures. The main goal of the project, forked from FreeBSD 4.8, is to radically change the kernel architecture, introducing microkernel-like message passing which will enhance scaling and reliability on symmetric multiprocessing (SMP) platforms while also being applicable to NUMA and clustered systems. The long-term goal is to provide a transparent single system image in clustered environments. DragonFly BSD originally supported both the IA-32 and x86-64 platforms, however support for IA-32 was dropped in version 4.0. Matthew Dillon, the founder of DragonFly BSD, believes supporting fewer platforms makes it easier for a project to do a proper, ground-up symmetric multiprocessing implementation.

Popularity

In September 2005, the BSD Certification Group, after advertising on a number of mailing lists, surveyed 4,330 BSD users, 3,958 of whom took the survey in English, to assess the relative popularity of the various BSD operating systems. About 77% of respondents used FreeBSD, 33% used OpenBSD, 16% used NetBSD, 2.6% used Dragonfly, and 6.6% used other (potentially non-BSD) systems. Other languages offered were Brazilian and European Portuguese, German, Italian, and Polish. Note that there was no control group or pre-screening of the survey takers. Those who checked "Other" were asked to specify that operating system.

Because survey takers were permitted to select more than one answer, the percentages shown in the graph, which are out of the number survey of participants, add up to greater than 100%. If a survey taker filled in more than one choice for "other", this is still only counted as one vote for other on this chart.

Another attempt to profile worldwide BSD usage is the *BSDstats Project, whose primary goal is to demonstrate to hardware vendors the penetration of BSD and viability of hardware drivers for the operating system. The project collects data monthly from any BSD system administrators willing to participate, and currently records the BSD market share of participating FreeBSD, OpenBSD, NetBSD, DragonflyBSD, Debian GNU/kFreeBSD, TrueOS, and MirBSD systems.

In 2020, a new independent project was introduced to collect statistics with the goal of significantly increasing the number of observed parameters.

DistroWatch, well known in the Linux community and often used as a rough guide to free operating system popularity, publishes page hits for each of the Linux distributions and other operating systems it covers. As of 27 March 2020, using a data span of the last six months it placed FreeBSD in 21st place with 452 hits per day, GhostBSD in 51st place with 243 hits, TrueOS in 54th place with 182 hits per day, DragonflyBSD in 75th place with 180 hits, OpenBSD in 80th place with 169 hits per day and NetBSD in 109th place with 105 hits per day.

Names, logos, slogans
The names FreeBSD and OpenBSD are references to software freedom: both in cost and open source.
NetBSD's name is a tribute to the Internet, which brought the original developers together.

The first BSD mascot was the BSD daemon, named after a common type of Unix software program, a daemon. FreeBSD still uses the image, a red cartoon daemon named Beastie, wielding a pitchfork, as its mascot today. In 2005, after a competition, a stylized version of Beastie's head designed and drawn by Anton Gural was chosen as the FreeBSD logo. The FreeBSD slogan is "The Power to Serve."

The NetBSD flag, designed in 2004 by Grant Bissett, is inspired by the original NetBSD logo, designed in 1994 by Shawn Mueller, portraying a number of BSD daemons raising a flag on top of a mound of computer equipment. This was based on a World War II photograph, Raising the Flag on Iwo Jima. The Board of Directors of The NetBSD Foundation believed this was too complicated, too hard to reproduce and had negative cultural ramifications and was thus not a suitable image for NetBSD in the corporate world. The new, simpler flag design replaced this. The NetBSD slogan is "Of course it runs NetBSD", referring to the operating system's portability.

Originally, OpenBSD used the BSD daemon as a mascot, sometimes with an added halo as a distinguishing mark, but OpenBSD later replaced its BSD daemon with Puffy. Although Puffy is usually referred to as a pufferfish, the spikes on the cartoon images give him a closer likeness to the porcupinefish. The logo is a reference to the fish's defensive capabilities and to the Blowfish cryptography algorithm used in OpenSSH. OpenBSD also has a number of slogans including "Secure by default", which was used in the first OpenBSD song, "E-railed", and "Free, Functional & Secure", and OpenBSD has released at least one original song with every release since 3.0.

The DragonFly BSD logo, designed by Joe Angrisano, is a dragonfly named Fred. A number of unofficial logos by various authors also show the dragonfly or stylized versions of it. DragonFly BSD considers itself to be "the logical continuation of the FreeBSD 4.x series." FireflyBSD has a similar logo, a firefly, showing its close relationship to DragonFly BSD. In fact, the FireflyBSD website states that proceeds from sales will go to the development of DragonFly BSD, suggesting that the two may in fact be very closely related.

PicoBSD's slogan is "For the little BSD in all of us," and its logo includes a version of FreeBSD's Beastie as a child, showing its close connection to FreeBSD, and the minimal amount of code needed to run as a Live CD.

A number of BSD OSes use stylized version of their respective names for logos. This includes macOS, TrueOS, GhostBSD, DesktopBSD, ClosedBSD, and MicroBSD. TrueOS's slogan is "Personal computing, served up BSD style!", GhostBSD's "A simple, secure BSD served on a Desktop." DesktopBSD's "A Step Towards BSD on the Desktop." MicroBSD's slogan is "The small secure unix like OS."

MirOS's site collects a variety of BSD mascots and Tux, the Linux mascot, together, illustrating the project's aim of supporting both BSD and Linux kernels. MirOS's slogan is "a wonderful operating system for a world of peace."

General information

See also

 List of BSD operating systems
 BSD license
 Comparison of open source operating systems
 Comparison of operating systems

Notes and references

Other sources
 
 
 
 
 
 
 
 
 
  A semi-official download page.
 
 
 
 

Comparison
BSD operating systems